David Garrett is a 2009 self-titled album by violinist David Garrett, released by Decca in the United States. It borrows all of its tracks from his earlier albums published in Europe, particularly Encore:

Track listing 
 "Summer" (Antonio Vivaldi)
 "Nothing Else Matters" (Metallica)
 "He's a Pirate" (Pirates of the Caribbean theme)
 "Smooth Criminal" (Michael Jackson)
 "Csardas - Gypsy Dance" (Vittorio Monti)
 "Who Wants to Live Forever?" (Queen)
 "Thunderstruck" (AC/DC)
 "Ain't No Sunshine" (Bill Withers)
 "Carmen Fantaisie" (Georges Bizet) featuring Paco Peña, guitar
 "Air" (J.S. Bach)
 "Zorba's Dance" (from the film Zorba the Greek)
 "Chelsea Girl" (David Garrett and Franck van der Heijden)
 "Rock Prelude" (David Garrett and Franck van der Heijden)
 "Dueling Banjos (Dueling Strings)" (from the film Deliverance)(Bonus track)

References 

David Garrett (musician) albums
2009 compilation albums
Decca Records albums